Idol Poland (season 1) was the first season of Idol Poland. It was the first international adaption of the British singing competition Pop Idol and the first show that went by the simple title Idol. It premiered on April 5, 2002, one month after the final of the original series, and lasted for six months until June 30. Alicja Janosz won over Ewelina Flinta and Szymon Wydra and therefore became the first female winner of the Idol series. It was also the first time that two females made it to the grand finale. On Christmas 2003 Janosz would compete with ten other countries Idol winners on World Idol where she eventually placed 8th.
As the show became a runaway success most finalists got signed and next to Janosz her fellow competitors Ewelina Flinta, Szymon Wydra, Tomasz Makowiecki (with Makowicki Band), Patrcyja Wódz (with girlgroup Queen) and most notably Anna Dąbrowska were able to established careers on the polish music market and enjoyed long running success.
Marcin Mroziński, who made it to the semifinals but was eliminated in the wildcard round, went on to establish a musical career before becoming one of polish most popular singers and represented Poland in the Eurovision Song Contest in 2010 where he was eliminated in the semifinals.

Finals

Finalists
(ages stated at time of contest)

Elimination Chart

Live Show Details

Heat 1 (1 May 2002)

Heat 2 (7 May 2002)

Heat 3 (10 May 2002)

Heat 4 (14 May 2002)

Heat 5 (17 May 2002)

Heat 6 (21 May 2002)

Heat 7 (24 May 2002)

Heat 8 (28 May 2002)

Live Show 1 (31 May 2002)
Theme: My Idol

Live Show 2 (9 June 2002)
Theme: Disco Fever

Live Show 3 (15 June 2002)
Theme: Rock

Live Show 4 (16 June 2002)
Theme: Hits

Live Show 5 (22 June 2002)
Theme: Musicals

Live Show 6: Semi-final (23 June 2002)
Theme: Songs with Soul

Live final (30 June 2002)

References

External links
Official Website via Web Archive

1
2002 Polish television seasons